Visa requirements for Vanuatu citizens are administrative entry restrictions by the authorities of other states placed on citizens of Vanuatu. , Ni-Vanuatu had visa-free or visa on arrival access to 103 countries and territories. Vanuatu signed a mutual visa waiver agreement with Schengen Area countries on 28 May 2015. A mutual visa waiver agreement was signed with Russia on 20 September 2016 and entered into force on 21 October 2016.  Obtaining a visa is now required for all 27 EU countries. The EU Council has partially suspended the EU visa waiver agreement with Vanuatu. This means that all Vanuatu citizens with a passport issued after 25 May 2015 are no longer eligible for visa-free travel to Europe. The European Council voted on 8 November, 2022 to fully suspend the visa waiver agreement with Vanuatu, citing risks posed by its investor citizenship program. As a consequence all Vanuatu passport holders require a Schengen visa for the bloc which is represented by the French Embassy in Port-Vila.

Visa requirements map

Visa requirements

Dependent, Disputed, or Restricted territories
Unrecognized or partially recognized regions

Dependent and autonomous territories

Non-visa restrictions

See also
Visa policy of Vanuatu
Vanuatuan passport

References and Notes
References

Notes

Vanuatu
Foreign relations of Vanuatu